Simone Luna Louise Söderlund Giertz (born 1 November 1990) is a Swedish inventor, maker, robotics enthusiast, TV host, and professional YouTuber. She has also previously worked in mixed martial arts sports journalism and was an editor for Sweden's official website Sweden.se.

Early life 
Giertz named the Disney cartoon character Gyro Gearloose as one of her earliest inspirations.

At the age of 16, Giertz spent a year in China as an exchange student. She stayed in Hefei, where she learned basic Mandarin. During her stay in China she also made an appearance on a Chinese sitcom called Huan Xi Long Xia Dang (the Happy Lobster Restaurant), where she played Catherine, an American girl who married a Chinese man.

She studied engineering physics at the Royal Institute of Technology (Kungliga Tekniska Högskolan), a research university in Stockholm, Sweden, but dropped out after a year.

Career
She started creating self-described "shitty" inventions after studying at Hyper Island in Stockholm, where she was inspired by the local open-source hardware community. Giertz's interest in electronics began in 2013; she made a toothbrush helmet for a children's show pilot episode on electronics, which was uploaded to YouTube after not being picked up, starting her YouTube career.

Giertz has previously branded herself as "the queen of shitty robots" on her YouTube channel, where she employs deadpan humor to demonstrate mechanical robots of her own creation to automate everyday tasks; despite working from a purely mechanical standpoint, they often fall short of practical usefulness, for comic effect. Giertz's creations have included an alarm clock that slaps the user, a lipstick applier, and one that shampoos the user's hair. When building her robots, Giertz would often not aim to make something useful, instead coming up with excessive solutions to potentially automatable situations. Giertz showcased several of these robots on The Late Show with Stephen Colbert.

In 2016, Giertz joined Tested.com, collaborating with Adam Savage on her first project, the Popcorn Feeding Helmet. In 2017, she hosted the comedy TV show Manick with Nisse Hallberg on Swedish TV6. The basic premise of the show is that the hosts invent funny creative solutions to everyday problems. In April 2018, she created a robot to promote season 2 of HBO's Westworld. Around this time Giertz had abandoned the concept of the "shitty robots", later explaining that it was no longer something she wanted to do, as she felt that the joke had played out.

In 2018, Simone Giertz presented at a TED conference. Her presentation was on "Why you should make useless things". She encouraged people to ask questions through creation, illustrating her ideas by presenting her own projects and robots.

In June 2019, Giertz announced that she and various other YouTube makers, including Laura Kampf, had converted a Tesla Model 3 into a pickup truck. The truck was built in response to both wanting an electric vehicle to avoid ever owning a gasoline-powered car and a pickup truck for practical reasons, but not being able to wait for the at-the-time only proposed Tesla pickup. The accompanying parody commercial and 31-minute video describing the build process went viral and received significant news coverage. She was subsequently invited to the unveiling of the Tesla's official pickup truck, the Cybertruck.

In August 2019, Giertz traveled to New Zealand to work on a mantis shrimp costume with Weta Workshop.

In June 2020, Giertz voiced a cartoon robot named CGO in Adventure Time: Distant Lands.

In May 2022 she started a product design company Yetch with an online shop. Around this time, she reflected in an interview with Fast Company that, "I'm a recovering self-deprecator. It's such a defense mechanism on the internet as well—like, the way you survive being an online creator is beating everyone to the joke and to the insult. I've been really trying to practice not talking myself down and talking down my skills." This change included a shift away from intentionally "shitty robots".

Personal life 
Giertz lived in a houseboat in Sweden from 2012 to 2016. From 2016 to 2020, Giertz lived in San Francisco. She announced on her channel in 2020 that she now lives in Los Angeles.

The Giertz family surname is of Low German origin. She is the daughter of television producer Nicola Söderlund and novelist and TV host Caroline Giertz, who Giertz describes as a "ghostbuster" due to her mother's work on paranormal reality TV show Det Okända. Giertz is a descendant of Lars Magnus Ericsson, founder of Ericsson.

On April 30, 2018, Giertz announced via YouTube that she had been diagnosed with a noncancerous brain tumor. After surgery to remove the grade I meningioma on May 30, 2018, she has continued to post humorous and upbeat accounts of her post-surgery progress, including photos of her "potential super-villain scar" and a public address video on her Patreon account. On January 18, 2019, Giertz reported that her tumor had returned. After a course of radiation treatments, Giertz again returned to production on May 29, 2019, describing her ordeal and presenting a project which converted her head alignment mask into a "work of art" (a lamp).

References

External links 

1990 births
21st-century Swedish scientists
21st-century Swedish women scientists
Living people
Swedish expatriates in the United States
21st-century Swedish inventors
Swedish YouTubers
Women inventors
Swedish roboticists
Women roboticists